CKKW-FM (99.5 FM) is a Canadian radio station licensed to Kitchener, Ontario, with studios located in Waterloo while its transmitter is located near Ottawa Street South and Trussler Rd in Kitchener. The station is owned by Bell Media and airs an adult hits format branded on-air as Bounce 99.5.

History
The station originally began broadcasting on July 30, 1959 at 1320 AM, until it moved to 1090 AM in 1975.

In February 1984, CKKW began AM-stereo broadcasting with a Motorola C-Quam format.

Originally owned by Carl Pollock and later becoming a subsidiary of his company Electrohome, CHUM Limited acquired CKKW in 1993, and shortly thereafter instated the oldies format and Oldies 1090 branding. This was maintained until 2009, except for a brief period from 2001 to 2002 when it was part of CHUM's short-lived sports radio network, The Team.

On April 10, 2008, CKKW applied to the Canadian Radio-television and Telecommunications Commission to convert the station to 99.5 MHz. The application indicated that CKKW will keep its present oldies format on FM. The application was approved on October 3, 2008.

The flip, which occurred on January 6, 2009, resulted in a continuation of the oldies format as KFUN 99.5. Although the station was allowed to simulcast at 1090 AM until April 6 of that year, the AM signal is believed to have been shut down on January 16; the old AM towers were taken down in March. CKKW later flipped to adult hits, but kept the same branding.

As part of a mass format reorganization by Bell Media, on May 18, 2021, CKKW rebranded as Bounce 99.5.

References

External links
 Bounce 99.5
 CKKW-FM History - Canadian Communications Foundation
 

KKW
KKW
KKW
Radio stations established in 1959
1959 establishments in Ontario